Magdolna Lakatos-Sira (née Sira; born September 22, 1964) is a Hungarian politician, member of the National Assembly (MP) from Fidesz Szabolcs-Szatmár-Bereg County Regional List between 2010 and 2014. She was a member of the Committee on Youth, Social, Family, and Housing Affairs and Committee on Health from May 14, 2010 to May 5, 2014.

She served as Mayor of Túristvándi between 1996 and 2014. She joined Fidesz in 2006. Later she joined Christian Democratic People's Party (KDNP) too in 2009. She was a member of the General Assembly of Szabolcs-Szatmár-Bereg County between 2006 and 2010. She has five children.

Personal life
She is married and has five children.

References

1964 births
Living people
Fidesz politicians
Christian Democratic People's Party (Hungary) politicians
Members of the National Assembly of Hungary (2010–2014)
Women members of the National Assembly of Hungary
Mayors of places in Hungary
People from Szabolcs-Szatmár-Bereg County
21st-century Hungarian women politicians